USS Edward McDonnell (FF-1043) was a frigate in the US Navy and the third in its class. Named for Medal of Honor recipient Vice Admiral Edward Orrick McDonnell.

Service history

Construction and commissioning
The keel for Edward McDonnell was laid at Avondale Shipyard in Westwego, Louisiana on 1 April 1963. She was launched at Avondale in January 1964, and was commissioned at Charleston Naval Shipyard, South Carolina as DE-1043 on 15 February 1965. She completed her fitting out at Norfolk Naval Shipyard, Virginia and became operational as part of the US Navy's Atlantic Fleet Anti-Submarine Warfare Forces on 14 January 1966.

Operational history
In May 1966, USS Edward McDonnell was transferred to the Escort Squadron VI (Cortron 6) with its home port at Naval Station Newport, Rhode Island. Throughout 1966 and 1967, Edward McDonnell was assigned to anti submarine operations and exercises in the Atlantic and the Mediterranean.

In February 1968, Edward McDonnell entered Boston Naval Shipyard for a 13-month overhaul. Following her refit, Edward McDonnell undertook a shakedown and training deployment in the Caribbean before returning to Newport in June 1969.

During 1975, Edward McDonnell was assigned to NATO's Standing Naval Force Atlantic (STANAVFORLANT) along with the Royal Netherlands Navy   and the West Germany Navy  .

Fate
USS Edward McDonnell was decommissioned on 30 September 1988, and struck from the Naval Register on 15 December 1992. She was moored at the Naval Inactive Ship Maintenance Facility in the Philadelphia Naval Shipyard awaiting disposal. She was sold for scrapping on 25 July 1995, and scrapping was completed at PNSY by 21 August 2002. The scrap value of the ship was $842 per ton.

References

External links

USS Edward McDonnell.com
USS Edward McDonnell.org (flash req.)
Navysite.de - FF1043

 

Garcia-class frigates
Ships built in Bridge City, Louisiana
1964 ships
Cold War frigates and destroyer escorts of the United States